Saba Mumtaz is a noted Indian television writer and producer. She is the writer of successful shows like Yeh Rishta Kya Kehlata Hai, Molki ..,Sarawati Chandra , Sapney Suhaney Ladakpan Key ..Ek Boond Ishq ... Moh moh key dhavey ..Navya .. Prithviraj Chauhan ...Shakuntala ..DharmVeer ...Parivaar ..Navya ...Haqeeqat ..Meri Sasu Maa ..Maryam Khan Reporting Live ... chand Chupa badal main .

among many others.

Early life and background
She studied mass communication at AJK, Mass Communication Research Centre, Jamia Milia Islamia University in Delhi.

Personal life
She is from Delhi, but resides in Mumbai with her daughter, Noveera.  As of 2019, she is working on her new shows.

Career
Saba got her first break in script writing with TV series, Haqeeqat on Sahara One in 2001, which was based on real-life incidents. This was followed by Dharti Ka Veer Yodha Prithviraj Chauhan (2006-2009), Dharam Veer (2008), Mohe Rang De (2009) and Mere Ghar Aayi Ek Nanhi Pari (2009) on Colors. She wrote for Yeh Rishta Kya Kehlata Hai (2009) and Chand Chupa Badal Mein (2010–2011) on Star Plus, and Ek Boond Ishq on Life OK.

Television
 As Writer
 Haqeeqat (2001)
 Dharti Ka Veer Yodha Prithviraj Chauhan (2006-2009)
 Parrivaar (2007 - 2008)
 Dharam Veer (2008)
 Mohe Rang De (2009)
 Mere Ghar Aayi Ek Nanhi Pari (2009)
 Yeh Rishta Kya Kehlata Hai (2009–present)
Shakuntala (2009)
 Chand Chupa Badal Mein (2010-2011)
 Dil Se Di Dua... Saubhagyavati Bhava? (2011 - 2013)
 Navya..Naye Dhadkan Naye Sawaal (2011 - 2012)
Bade Achhe Lagte Hain (2011 - 2014)
Sasural Simar Ka (2011 - 2018)
Sapne Suhane Ladakpan Ke (2012 - 2015)
 Ek Boond Ishq (2013)
Saraswatichandra (2013 - 2014)
  Hum Hain Na (2014-2015)
 Meri Saasu Maa (2016) 
 Razia Sultan (2015)
 Yeh Moh Moh Ke Dhaagey (2017)
Mariam Khan - Reporting Live (2018 - 2019)
Molkki (2020–2022)

Feature Film - Disha [ FOR FILMS DIVISION ]

As Director

Feature Film - Disha [ FOR FILMS DIVISION ]

As Producer

Ek Boond Ishq (2013)

Yeh Moh Moh Ke Dhaagey (2017)

Meri Saasu Maa (2016)

Feature Film - Disha [ FOR FILMS DIVISION ]

References

External links
 

Indian television writers
Living people
Indian Muslims
Indian women television producers
Indian television producers
Jamia Millia Islamia alumni
Indian women television writers
21st-century Indian women writers
21st-century Indian dramatists and playwrights
Screenwriters from Delhi
Women writers from Delhi
Women television producers
Year of birth missing (living people)
21st-century Indian screenwriters